The 1988–89 Kansas State Wildcats men's basketball team represented Kansas State University as a member of the Big 8 Conference during the 1988–89 NCAA Division I men's basketball season. The head coach was Lon Kruger who was in his third of four years at the helm of his alma mater.  The Wildcats finished with a record of 19–11 (8–6 Big 8), and received an at-large bid to the NCAA tournament as No. 6 seed in the East region. Kansas State lost to Minnesota in the opening round of the tournament.

The team played its home games at Bramlage Coliseum in Manhattan, Kansas. It was the first season the team played in the new arena after leaving Ahearn Field House after the 1987–88 season. Kansas State defeated , 81–77, in the first game played at Bramlage Coliseum.

Roster

Schedule and results

|-
!colspan=6 style=| Regular Season

|-
!colspan=6 style=| Big 8 Tournament

|-
!colspan=6 style=| NCAA Tournament

References

Kansas State
Kansas State
Kansas State Wildcats men's basketball seasons
1988 in sports in Kansas
1989 in sports in Kansas